Al-Jarawh is a sub-district located in Sa'fan District, Sana'a Governorate, Yemen. Al-Jarawh had a population of 3459 according to the 2004 census.

References 

Sub-districts in Sa'fan District